The 1909–10 Trinity Blue and White's basketball team represented Trinity College (later renamed Duke University) during the 1909–10 men's college basketball season. The head coach was Wilbur Wade Card and the team finished with an overall record of 4–4

Schedule

|-

References

Duke Blue Devils men's basketball seasons
Duke
1909 in sports in North Carolina
1910 in sports in North Carolina